Between 1865 and 1866, five cutters of the Chase Class were constructed for the Revenue Cutter Service. These cutters were named: Chase, Fessenden, Johnson, McCulloch and Sherman.  They were wooden-hulled side-wheel steamers and powered by walking-beam steam engines.  Their hulls were constructed with iron diagonal bracing for added strength.  They were designed for operations on the Great Lakes. However, the McCulloch served in the Gulf of Mexico and the Atlantic.

The revenue cutter Andrew Johnson, also known as simply Johnson, was commissioned on 1 May 1865 for service on the Great Lakes.  She was based out of Milwaukee, Wisconsin for her entire Revenue Cutter Service career.  During the navigation season, the Johnson patrolled the waters of the Great Lakes. In the winter months, usually late November to May, she was laid up.

She was rebuilt in Manitowoc, Wisconsin in 1879, with two feet being added to her beam.  She was placed out of service and sold to Charles E. Benham for $2,250 in May, 1897.

She was later purchased by the Ohio Naval Militia, predecessor of the Naval Reserve, and used for training.

References
Donald Canney.  U.S. Coast Guard and Revenue Cutters, 1790-1935.  Annapolis, MD: Naval Institute Press, 1995.
U.S. Coast Guard.  Record of Movements: Vessels of the United States Coast Guard: 1790 - December 31, 1933.  Washington, DC: U.S. Government Printing Office, 1934; 1989 (reprint).

Ships of the United States Revenue Cutter Service
1865 ships
Ships built in Buffalo, New York
Military in Ohio